Sophia D. King (born February 14, 1966) is an American politician and member of Chicago City Council, currently serving as alderman from the 4th ward, which includes portions of the neighborhoods Bronzeville, Hyde Park, Kenwood, Oakland, and South Loop. King was appointed to the position in 2016 to replace retiring incumbent Will Burns. She won a special election to serve out the rest term of the term in 2017 and was re-elected to a full term in 2019. She is a member and chair of the City Council's Progressive Reform Caucus. King forwent reelection to the city council in 2023 in order to make an unsuccessful run for mayor of Chicago in the 2023 Chicago mayoral election.

Early life and education
King was born in Colorado and later raised in Evanston, Illinois. She earned a bachelor's from the University of Illinois at Urbana-Champaign and a master's in education and social policy from Northwestern University. In the late 1980s, King moved to Kenwood in a house she built with her husband Alan. Her husband studied for the bar with Michelle Obama and they are friends of the Obama family.

Professional career
In 1996, King helped to establish Ariel Community Academy, a K-8 school, with Ariel Investments C.E.O. Mellody Hobson. She was involved in 2007–2008 with Obama's primary campaign and general election campaign.

Prior to her appointment to City Council, she was President of Harriet's Daughters, a non-profit organization dedicated to employment and wealth creation opportunities for African-American neighborhoods.

In April 2016, King was appointed by Mayor Rahm Emanuel to replace outgoing 4th ward alderman Will Burns, who had resigned to become Vice President of Governmental Affairs with AirBnB.

Chicago City Council
King was sworn in to the City Council on April 13, 2016.

In anticipation of running for the seat in the 2017 special election, King created a political action committee on March 9, 2016. King was appointed from a field of three finalists and eighteen initial applicants. She won outright election in a 2017 special election, receiving 63.77% of the vote against four opponents. She had run with the endorsement by President Barack Obama, with whom she has long been friends.

She is a member of the following committees; Committees, Rules and Ethics, Health and Environmental Protection, Housing and Real Estate, Pedestrian and Traffic Safety, Transportation and Public Way and Workforce Development and Audit.

King is chair of the Chicago City Council Progressive Reform Caucus.

In the 2019 Chicago mayoral election, King endorsed Toni Preckwinkle, declaring her support for her in advance of the first round of the election upon Preckwinkle's entrance into the mayoral race.

King was involved in the creation of the Civilian Office of Police Accountability. She was also involved with the successful push to rename Congress Parkway for Ida B. Wells. She was also involved in the successful push to rename Lake Shore Drive for Jean Baptiste Point du Sable.

2023 mayoral campaign
In August 2022, King announced she would be running in the 2023 Chicago mayoral election, proving incumbent mayor Lori Lightfoot with a female challenger in a race that had previously seen only male challengers to Lightfoot, the city's second female mayor. As a result, she did not seek reelection to the City Council.

As a mayoral candidate, King is proposing the expanding the size of the Chicago police force by filling 1,600 vacancies and returning 1,000 retired officers to the force to investigate non-violent crimes.

In the initial round of the election, King was defeated, placing eighth of nine candidates with less than 7,200 votes (1.27% of the election's overall vote), a number of votes which was even less than her vote total had been in her previous 2019 aldermanic reelection.

Electoral history

External links

 Official Chicago City Council listing for Sophia King

References

1966 births
21st-century American politicians
21st-century American women politicians
African-American women in politics
African-American city council members in Illinois
Chicago City Council members
University of Illinois Urbana-Champaign alumni
Northwestern University School of Education and Social Policy alumni
Illinois Democrats
Living people
People from Evanston, Illinois
Women city councillors in Illinois
Chicago City Council members appointed by Rahm Emanuel